Luksefjell Church is a parish church of the Church of Norway in Skien Municipality in Vestfold og Telemark county, Norway. It is located in the village of Luksefjell. It is one of the churches for the Gjerpen parish which is part of the Skien prosti (deanery) in the Diocese of Agder og Telemark. The white, wooden church was built in a rectangular design in 1858 using plans drawn up by the architect Anders Thorsen. The church seats about 104 people.

History

During the middle ages, there was a church in Luksefjell, but it was closed centuries ago, with very little known about the building or its location. The Løvenskiold family donated land at Luksefjell, on the shore of the lake Fjellvannet. Anders Thorsen was hired to design and build the chapel in 1858. The new chapel was consecrated on 27 October 1858. The wooden building has a rectangular design with the nave and choir in the same room. There is a sacristy in a smaller room to the east of the main room. In 1873, a new tower was built on the west end of the nave. There is a church porch under the tower. In 1948, the church was wired for electricity. In 1960, a new copper roof was installed. Around the turn of the 21st century, the chapel was made a parish church and re-named as Luksefjell Church.

See also
List of churches in Agder og Telemark

References

Buildings and structures in Skien
Churches in Vestfold og Telemark
Rectangular churches in Norway
Wooden churches in Norway
19th-century Church of Norway church buildings
Churches completed in 1858
1858 establishments in Norway